Lori McNeil (born December 18, 1963) is an American tennis coach and former top 10 professional tennis player. McNeil was a singles semifinalist at the US Open in 1987 and Wimbledon in 1994, a women's doubles finalist at the Australian Open in 1987 with Zina Garrison and French Open mixed-doubles winner in 1988 with Jorge Lozano.

Personal
McNeil was born the youngest of four siblings to mother Dorothy and father Charlie McNeil, who played professional football with the San Diego Chargers during the 1960s. Moving from San Diego to Houston, McNeil developed her tennis skills at MacGregor Park playground, a public facility in the Third Ward district. It was there she became close childhood friends with fellow future professional tennis player, Zina Garrison.

Career
Lori McNeil attended Oklahoma State University for two years and played tennis for the Cowgirls, reaching the 1983 NCAA quarterfinals (losing to eventual champion Beth Herr from USC).

McNeil played on the WTA Tour for 19 years from 1983–2002. She won a total of 10 singles and 33 doubles titles during her career. Her career-high world rankings were No. 9 in singles (in 1988) and No. 4 in doubles (in 1987).

In 1987, McNeil received the WTA Most Improved Player of the Year award.

McNeil is perhaps best remembered for her results against Steffi Graf. In 1992, she defeated Graf 7–6, 6–4 in the first round of the WTA Tour Championships, marking the first time since 1985 that Graf had lost in the opening round of a tournament. Then, in 1994, McNeil beat Graf 7–5, 7–6 in the first round at Wimbledon, the first time in Grand Slam history that a defending champion had suffered a first-round loss.

That year, McNeil went on to reach the semifinals at Wimbledon before losing to eventual-champion Conchita Martínez, 6–3, 2–6, 8–10. This equalled McNeil's best-ever Grand Slam singles performance – she also reached the semifinals at the US Open in 1987 (after defeating six-time champion Chris Evert in the quarterfinals) where she lost to Graf, 6–4, 2–6, 4–6.

Despite never winning a women's doubles Grand Slam title, she reached the quarterfinal stage or better on 22 occasions at Grand Slam level, and won multiple WTA Tour doubles titles with many of the leading doubles players of the era, including Martina Navratilova, Gigi Fernández, Rennae Stubbs, Katrina Adams, Zina Garrison and Helena Suková.

From 2001-2004, McNeil coached former top-5 player Amanda Coetzer. Partnering together, coach and student reached the doubles quarterfinals of the 2002 Australian Open. In 2004 and 2008, McNeil was also Assistant Coach to the US Olympic tennis teams.

In 2006, McNeil was inducted into the ITA Hall of Fame.

Grand Slam finals

Doubles: 1 (runner-up)

Mixed doubles: 4 (1 title, 3 runner-ups)

WTA career finals

Singles: 21 (10 titles, 11 runner-ups)

Doubles: 64 (33 titles, 31 runner-ups)

Grand Slam performance timelines

Singles

Doubles

Mixed doubles

References

External links
 
 
 

African-American female tennis players
American female tennis players
French Open champions
Tennis players from San Diego
1963 births
Living people
Grand Slam (tennis) champions in mixed doubles
Oklahoma State University alumni
College sports All-Americans
21st-century African-American people
21st-century African-American women
20th-century African-American sportspeople
20th-century African-American women
Tennis players from Houston
Oklahoma State Cowgirls tennis players